Anchor Hocking Company is a manufacturer of glassware. The Hocking Glass Company was founded in 1905 by Isaac Jacob (Ike) Collins in Lancaster, Ohio, and named after the Hocking River.

That company merged with the Anchor Cap and Closure Corporation in 1937. From 1937 to 1983, the company operated the oldest glass-manufacturing facility in the United States, established in 1863, in Salem, New Jersey. Anchor Hocking's wine and spirit bottles are crafted at a factory in Monaca, Pennsylvania. It also had facilities in Elmira, New York, and Streator, Illinois. In 1987, the Newell Company acquired Anchor Hocking Corporation.

The company was the sponsor of the radio drama Casey, Crime Photographer. It was also slated to sponsor television's first late-night talk show, The Don Hornsby Show, before Hornsby suddenly died shortly before its debut.

In 2012, then-owner Monomoy merged Anchor Hocking with Oneida and created EveryWare Global. In January 2014, EveryWare Global announced its plans to close its regional office and the Oneida outlet store, both in Sherrill, New York, with the process starting in April. 
The original Oneida outlet store in Sherrill, New York, was closed April 26, 2014. EveryWare Global filed for bankruptcy in 2015. EveryWare Global was renamed The Oneida Group in 2017.

Anchor Hocking and their headquarters in Lancaster, Ohio, are a focus of Brian Alexander's February 2017 book Glass House.

Locations 
Most of the original Anchor Hocking glass container plants then operating were "spun off” in 1983 to form the newly created Anchor Glass Container Corporation, with headquarters in Tampa, Florida. A wide variety of glass containers for many types of foods, beverages, and other products was produced. AGCC filed for bankruptcy in 2011. Their "stylized anchor" trademark logo, which consists of two angular letter, G oriented back-to-back (or “mirrored” ) was registered with the U.S. Patent and Trademark Office on February 19, 1985. Anchor Glass Container has manufacturing facilities in China; Tampa, Florida; Jacksonville, Florida; Warner Robins, Georgia; Lawrenceburg, Indiana; Henryetta, Oklahoma; Shakopee, Minnesota; and Elmira, New York.

Depression glass 

The company was a major producer of Depression glass. The first glassware produced as Anchor Hocking Glass Company was Royal Ruby in 1939. In addition, Anchor Hocking produced Forest Green Glass and Fire-King and Anchor Ovenware.

See also 
 Newell Company

References

External links 

 

Glassmaking companies of the United States
Companies that filed for Chapter 11 bankruptcy in 2002
Companies that filed for Chapter 11 bankruptcy in 2004
Companies that filed for Chapter 11 bankruptcy in 2015
Manufacturing companies based in Ohio
Manufacturing companies established in 1905
1905 establishments in Ohio
1937 mergers and acquisitions
1987 mergers and acquisitions
American brands